Supersam was a modernist supermarket in Warsaw, at Mokotowski Square, built in 1962 and designed by Jerzy Hryniewiecki, Maciej Krasinski and Ewa Krasińska with structural engineer Wacław Zalewski. It was the first self-serve supermarket in the country and one of the greatest achievements of modernism in Poland. Supersam was demolished in 2006 and replaced by a new architectural complex built between 2013 and 2015.

History
The Warsaw supermarket was built in 1962 at the Lublin Union Square (formerly also Mokotowski square,) on the site of the former Polish Radio building. Historically (1770-1818), this place was called Rondo Mokotowskie and standing here was the Southern Gate to the city. The supermarket building was an innovative design with a roof on the principle of tensegrity suspended and kept in place by steel girders and cables, designed by three architects: Professor Jerzy Hryniewiecki, Maciej Krasinski, Maciej Gintowt and three engineers: Waclaw Zalewski, a Professor Emeritus of MIT,  Professor Stanislaw Kusia and Andrzej Żórawski.

Although a campaign was carried out to save the building from destruction as an architectural monument valuable PRL and unique construction design for its time, Supersam was demolished in December 2006.

Architecture and technology 
A hanging roof was desired from the beginning, but this would require sloping roof mainstays that would take up valuable real estate and would make the building structure vulnerable to catastrophic failure due to accidents or vandalism. Through progressive designs, a method was developed, by structural engineer Wacław Zalewski, employing the principle of tensegrity, to eliminate the backstays by alternating cables and arches of similar curvature. The outward thrust of arches at their highest points exactly balances the inward pull of the cables at each end.
This whole structure was supported vertically by columns.

As the building aged, and further demands were placed on the roof structure, the building had to eventually be demolished reportedly because it was unsafe, according to the building owner, but this is a disputed fact.

Lublin Union Square
In 2009, a new Supersam was opened in a new location in Katowice the corner of Domaniewska and Puławska, led by the Cooperative Warszawska Spółdzielnia Spożywców Supersam  who served the previous building. This hall is to be temporary until the hill by the developer 90-meter triangular office building surrounded by a mall on the site of the former Supersam.

In the years 2010-2013 in the place where the former Supersam existed, a new office building and commercial space at Lublin Union Square called the "Plac Unii" (Union Square). 12 October 2013 a new "Supersam" was built. The buildings will house a 15,000 square meter shopping mall and 41,000 m2 of class A+ office space. The total area of the building, including the underground levels, will exceed 100,000 square meters.
The complex foundation will feature four underground floors. The three lowest floors will serve as a parking lot for 800 cars.
Whereas, the floor just below ground level will host a delicatessen operated by merchants of the Supersam Grocers Cooperative, after years, making their come-back to the Lublin Union Square.

See also
 Spodek
 Wacław Zalewski

References

 http://www.pora.pl/place/23702.supersam
 https://news.google.com/newspapers?id=V5cpAAAAIBAJ&sjid=k8kEAAAAIBAJ&pg=864%2C5099182

External links
 Art, Politics and a Shuttered Supermarket in Poland, MATTHEW KAMINSKi, The Wall Street Journal
 Super Sam – Plac Unii Lubelskiej (Lublin Union Square)
 Plac Unii Premium Italian Brands Coming This Autumn
 Warsaw has a new landmark
 Archive article - Defending Communist-era architecture Originally published by the now-defunct magazine, Poland Monthly, in May 2007.

Buildings and structures in Warsaw
Shopping malls in Poland
1962 establishments in Poland
Shopping malls established in 1962
Defunct shopping malls
2006 disestablishments in Poland
Grocery store buildings
Buildings and structures demolished in 2006
Demolished buildings and structures in Poland